Arctolamia fasciata is a species of flat-faced longhorn beetles belonging to the family Cerambycidae.

Description
Body is almost rectangular and elytra have two wide dark brown transverse bands on a greyish background. Pronotum is black, with many irregular wrinkle and sharp spines. Elytra and legs are densely hairy. In males antennae are longer than the body. Antennal segments show black or brown long tufts.

Distribution
This species is present in China, Laos, Malaysia, Myanmar, Thailand and Vietnam.

References

Lamiini